Toyohashi University of Technology (豊橋技術科学大学; Toyohashi Gijutsu Kagaku Daigaku), often abbreviated to Toyohashi Tech, or TUT, is a national engineering university located in Toyohashi, Aichi, Japan. Distinguished for the upper-division student body where over 80% of them are transfer students from 5-year Technical Colleges called Kōsens, the Toyohashi Tech is one of the only two Universities of Technology, a form of universities in Japan, the other being Nagaoka University of Technology. Toyohashi Tech is also noted for the fact that majority of the students proceed to graduate schools. The university is locally nicknamed Gikadai (技科大).

History 
Toyohashi University of Technology was founded on October 1, 1976, after the government’s decision to establish the Graduate School of Science and Technology in Toyohashi city in 1974. This is based on the request from Japanese National Technical Colleges, to the Minister of Education in 1972.

Organization

Undergraduate School 
Departments of Engineering are reconstructed into 5 new departments from April 2010.
Faculty of Engineering
Department of Mechanical Engineering
Mechanical System Design Course
Material and Manufacturing Course
System Control and Robotics Course
Environment and Energy Course
Department of Electrical and Electronic Information Engineering
Electronic Materials Course
Electrical System Course
Integrated Electronics Course
Information and Communication System Course
Department of Computer Science and Engineering
Computer and Information Science Course
Information and Systems Science Course
Department of Environmental and Life Sciences
Sustainable Development Course
Life and Materials Science Course
Department of Architecture and Civil Engineering
Architecture and Building Course
Civil and Environmental Engineering Course

Graduate school 
Master's and Doctoral Programs
Department of Mechanical Engineering
Department of Electrical and Electronic Information Engineering
Department of Computer Science and Engineering
Department of Environmental and Life Sciences
Department of Architecture and Civil Engineering

Research Institutes 
Electronics-Inspired Interdisciplinary Research Institute
Electronics-Inspired Interdisciplinary Research Institute (EIIRIS)
Venture Business Laboratory (VBL)
Incubation Center for Venture Business

Organization for International Affairs
International Cooperation Center for Engineering Education Development
Center for International Relations

Organization for Development of Innovative Research and technology
Cooperative Research Facility Center
Research Center for Future Vehicle City
Research Center for Collaborative Area Risk Management
Center for Human-robot Symbiosis Research
Research Center for Agrotechnology and Biotechnology

Organization for the University Library and Computer Center
University Library
Information and media Center

Other
Research Center for Physical Fitness, Sports and Health

Notable alumni

Academia 
Daisuke Takahashi - a computer scientist
Tomoyoshi Soga - a chemist at Keio University researching metabolomics

Literature 
Otsuichi - a novelist

Media 
Masayuki Ishii - a journalist

Presidents 
Yoneichiro Sakaki (1976–1984)
Namio Honda (1984–1990)
Shin'ichi Sasaki (1990–1996)
Keishi Gotō (1996–2002)
Tatau Nishinaga (2002–2008)
Yoshiyuki Sakaki (2008–present)

References

External links 
Toyohashi University of Technology - English official website
Toyohashi tech e-Newsletter - Issued 4 times a year, including its research highlights

 
Japanese national universities
Engineering universities and colleges in Japan
Toyohashi
Educational institutions established in 1976
1976 establishments in Japan